Judge Watkins may refer to:

Harry Evans Watkins (1898–1963), judge of the United States District Courts for the Northern and the Southern Districts of West Virginia
Henry Hitt Watkins (1866–1947), judge of the United States District Court for the Western District of South Carolina
Robert Dorsey Watkins (1900–1986), judge of the United States District Court for the District of Maryland
William Keith Watkins (born 1951), judge of the United States District Court for the Middle District of Alabama

See also
Justice Watkins (disambiguation)